The Ecuadorian tyrannulet (Phylloscartes gualaquizae) is a species of bird in the family Tyrannidae. It is found in Ecuador and northern Peru. Its natural habitat is subtropical or tropical moist montane forests.

References

Ecuadorian tyrannulet
Birds of the Ecuadorian Andes
Ecuadorian tyrannulet
Ecuadorian tyrannulet]
Taxonomy articles created by Polbot